Station Cove Falls, near Walhalla, South Carolina, is a  high cascade waterfall in the Andrew Pickens Ranger District of the Sumter National Forest, near Oconee Station State Historic Site. The falls is reached by an easy 3/4 mile hike with one stream crossing through a canopy of mature basswood, buckeye, and American beech. During the months of March and April, the trail features one of the largest wildflower displays in South Carolina.

References

Waterfalls of South Carolina
Protected areas of Oconee County, South Carolina
Sumter National Forest
Landforms of Oconee County, South Carolina